Ho Un-byol (born 19 January 1992) is a North Korean football defender for the North Korea women's national football team and for the April 25 Sports Club in the DPR Korea Women's League in North Korea. She was part of the team at the 2007 FIFA Women's World Cup and 2011 FIFA Women's World Cup. In December 2013 she was given the title of "Merited Athlete" after becoming top scorer in the 2013 EAFF Women's East Asian Cup, and in February 2014, she was named North Korean Female Footballer of the Year for 2013.

International goals

Under 19

National team

References

External links
 

1992 births
Living people
North Korean women's footballers
North Korea women's international footballers
Place of birth missing (living people)
2011 FIFA Women's World Cup players
Women's association football defenders
2007 FIFA Women's World Cup players
Asian Games gold medalists for North Korea
Asian Games silver medalists for North Korea
Asian Games medalists in football
Footballers at the 2010 Asian Games
Footballers at the 2014 Asian Games
Medalists at the 2010 Asian Games
Medalists at the 2014 Asian Games
21st-century North Korean women